This is a list of episodes of the Walt Disney anthology television series.

Walt Disney's Disneyland episodes

Conceived as a means to fund development and construction of Disneyland, the television program originally focused on and highlighted the original four lands of the park.

Season 1 (1954–1955)

Season 2 (1955–1956)

Season 3 (1956–1957)

Season 4 (1957–1958)

Walt Disney Presents episodes

Season 5 (1958–1959)

Season 6 (1959–1960)

Season 7 (1960–1961)

Walt Disney's Wonderful World of Color episodes

Season 8 (1961–1962)

Season 9 (1962–1963)

Season 10 (1963–1964)

Season 11 (1964–1965)

Season 12 (1965–1966)

Season 13 (1966–1967)

Season 14 (1967–1968)

Season 15 (1968–1969)

The Wonderful World of Disney episodes (first run)

Season 16 (1969–1970)

Season 17 (1970–1971)

Season 18 (1971–1972)

Season 19 (1972–1973)

Season 20 (1973–1974)

Season 21 (1974–1975)

Season 22 (1975–1976)

Season 23 (1976–1977)

Season 24 (1977–1978)

Season 25 (1978–1979)

Disney's Wonderful World episodes

Season 26 (1979–1980)

Season 27 (1980–1981)

Walt Disney episodes

Season 28 (1981–1982)

Season 29 (1982–1983)

The Disney Sunday Movie episodes

Season 30 (1986)

Disney Summer Classics (1986)

Season 31 (1986–1987)

Season 32 (1987–1988)

The Magical World of Disney episodes

Season 33 (1988–1989)

Season 34 (1989–1990)

Season 35 (1990–1991)

Season 36 (1991–1992)

Season 37 (1992–1993)

Season 38 (1993–1994)

Season 39 (1994–1995)

Season 40 (1995–1996)

Season 41 (1996–1997)

The Wonderful World of Disney episodes (second run)
Note: No original episodes produced for this incarnation. Earlier animated films either made their TV debut or were re-broadcast.

Season 42 (1997–1998)

Season 43 (1998–1999)

Season 44 (1999–2000)

Season 45 (2000–2001)

Season 46 (2001–2002)

Season 47 (2002–2003)

Season 48 (2003–2004)

Season 49 (2004–2005)

Season 50 (2005–2006)

Season 51 (2006–2007)

Season 52 (2007-2008)

Season 53 (2012–2019)

Season 54 (2020)

Season 55 (2020–2021)

Season 56 (2021–2022)

Season 57 (2022–2023)

References

Disney
Anthology television series episodes